Theobald of Marly (died 8 December 1247) was a French abbot and saint.  He was born at the castle of Marly, Montmorency, and was trained as a knight.  He served as a knight at the court of Philip Augustus, though he later entered the Cistercian monastery of Vaux-de-Cernay in 1220.  He was elected prior in 1230 and ninth abbot in 1235.  He was held in high esteem by Saint Louis.

Veneration
He is venerated in Thann and Hemel Hempstead.

References

External links
Saint of the Day, July 27: Theobald of Marly at SaintPatrickDC.org

Medieval French saints
1247 deaths
French Cistercians
13th-century Christian saints
Year of birth unknown